was a  after Juei and before Bunji. This period spanned the years from April 1184 through August 1185.

Change of era
 1184 : The new era name was created to mark an event or a number of events. The previous era ended and a new one commenced in Juei 3, on the 16th day of the 4th month of 1184.

Events of the Genryaku era
 1185 (Genryaku 2, 24th day of the 3rd month): the Taira (also known as the Heike) and the Minamoto clashed in the Battle of Dan-no-ura; and the Heike were utterly defeated.
 1185 (Genryaku 2, 9th day of the 7th month): Great earthquake caused turmoil in the capital and in the neighboring provinces.

References

Sources
 Brown, Delmer M. and Ichirō Ishida, eds. (1979).  Gukanshō: The Future and the Past. Berkeley: University of California Press. ;  OCLC 251325323
 Nussbaum, Louis-Frédéric and Käthe Roth. (2005).  Japan encyclopedia. Cambridge: Harvard University Press. ;  OCLC 58053128
 Titsingh, Isaac. (1834). Nihon Odai Ichiran; ou,  Annales des empereurs du Japon.  Paris: Royal Asiatic Society, Oriental Translation Fund of Great Britain and Ireland. OCLC 5850691
 Varley, H. Paul. (1980). A Chronicle of Gods and Sovereigns: Jinnō Shōtōki of Kitabatake Chikafusa. New York: Columbia University Press. ;  OCLC 6042764

External links
 National Diet Library, "The Japanese Calendar" -- historical overview plus illustrative images from library's collection

Japanese eras
1180s in Japan